Nat Phat Tae Sone Twal Myar is a 2010 Burmese comedy-drama film, directed by Ko Zaw (Ar Yone Oo) starring Pyay Ti Oo, Eaindra Kyaw Zin, Soe Myat Thuzar, Thet Mon Myint and Nyi Nanda. The film, produced by Sein Htay Film Production premiered Myanmar on July 2, 2010.

Cast
Pyay Ti Oo as Lu Kywal
Eaindra Kyaw Zin as May Thatti
Soe Myat Thuzar as Daw Mya Sein
Thet Mon Myint as Sin Yupakar
Nyi Nanda as Moe Lone Maing
Ye Aung as U Ba Thet

References

2010 films
2010s Burmese-language films
Burmese comedy-drama films
Films shot in Myanmar
2010 comedy-drama films